Palazzo Piccolomini may refer to:

Palazzo Piccolomini, Pienza
Palazzo Piccolomini, Siena
Palazzo Piccolomini-Clementini
Palazzo Chigi all Postierla, sometimes called the Chigi-Piccolomini or Piccolomini-Adami